The 2020–21 Rink Hockey Euroleague was the 56th season of Europe's premier club roller hockey tournament organised by World Skate Europe – Rink Hockey, and the 24th season since it was renamed from European Champion Clubs' Cup to Euroleague.

The defending champions Sporting CP defeated Porto in the final to claim their second consecutive title and third overall.

Team allocation

Association ranking

Due to the cancelation of the tournament's last edition, the 2019–20 season was discarded and associations were allocated places according to the same coefficient as in the 2018–19 season, taking in account the performance of each association's representative teams in European competitions between the 2015–16 and the 2018–19 seasons.

Participation is reserved to teams from associations that have an effective capacity to organise annually their own national championships. They will all have at least one team entering the competition. To allocate the other nine places, the D'Hondt method was applied to the coefficient of each association, for a maximum of four teams. In case of withdrawals, priority would be given according to the order established by the D'Hondt method.

Teams
The labels in the parentheses show how each team qualified for the place of its starting round:
TH: Euroleague title holders
1st, 2nd, 3rd, 4th, etc.: League positions of the previous season
Abd-: League positions of abandoned season due to the COVID-19 pandemic in Europe as determined by the national association
Dis-: The previous season was discarded due to the COVID-19 pandemic in Europe and the 2018–19 season positions were used for qualification

Originally, as stated by World Skate Europe – Rink Hockey (WSE–RH), thirteen teams registered to play the tournament. Missing three teams to complete the regular field of sixteen, WSE–RH sent a request to three teams qualified for the World Skate Europe Cup to join the competition. The teams joining the field of sixteen were Barcelos, from Portugal, Coutras, from France, and Genève, from Switzerland. The original 2020–21 Rink Hockey Euroleague tournament field was as follows:

Notes

Effects of the COVID-19 pandemic
On 18 October 2020, the World Skate Europe-Rink Hockey Committee decided to postpone most matchday 1 matches due to travel restrictions imposed by the COVID-19 pandemic in Europe. Later that month, on 29 October, it was announced that all WSERHC international competitions would be suspended until the end of the year.

On 17 January 2021, an updated list of clubs interested in participating under new conditions was published, with all but the nine Portuguese and Spanish clubs giving up on the competition. A new format for the 9 teams was established, consisting of two stages. The first stage, the qualifying stage, consists of three groups of three teams, each one playing one match against the other two teams in the same group at a centralized location. The second stage, the final four, consists of single-legged semi-finals and final with the teams finishing first in each qualifying stage group as well as the best runner up, also played at a centralized location.

Round and draw dates
The schedule of the competition was as follows.

The original schedule of the competition, as planned before the pandemic, was as follows.

Qualifying phase

Tiebreakers
Teams were ranked according to points (3 points for a win, 1 point for a draw, 0 points for a loss). If two or more teams were tied on points, the following tiebreaking criteria were applied, in the order given, to determine the rankings:
Points in head-to-head matches among the tied teams;
Goal difference in all group matches;
Goal ratio, resulting from dividing the total number of goals scored by the total number of goals conceded;
Team fouls;
Blue cards;
Red cards.

Group A

Group B

Group C

Ranking of second-placed teams

Final four
All times are local, WEST (UTC+1).

Bracket

Semi-finals

Final

See also
2020–21 World Skate Europe Cup
2020–21 Rink Hockey European Female League

References

External links
Comité Européen de Rink-Hockey (official website)

Rink Hockey Euroleague
Rink Hockey Euroleague
Rink Hockey Euroleague